Chaptalia is a genus of flowering plants in the family Asteraceae.

Chaptalia is native primarily to Mesoamerica, South America, and the West Indies, with a few species in the United States.

 Species

 Chaptalia albicans (Sw.) Vent. ex B.D.Jacks.
 Chaptalia angustata Urb.
 Chaptalia anisobasis S.F.Blake
 Chaptalia araneosa Casar.
 Chaptalia arechavaletae Arechav.
 Chaptalia azuensis Urb. & Ekman
 Chaptalia callacallensis Cuatrec.
 Chaptalia chapadensis D.J.N.Hind
 Chaptalia cipoensis Roque
 Chaptalia comptonioides Britton & P.Wilson
 Chaptalia cordata Hieron.
 Chaptalia cordifolia (Baker) Cabrera
 Chaptalia crassiuscula Urb.
 Chaptalia crispata Urb. & Ekman
 Chaptalia dentata (L.) Cass.
 Chaptalia denticellata Urb. & Ekman
 Chaptalia denticulata (Baker) Zardini
 Chaptalia diversifolia Greene
 Chaptalia dolichopoda Urb. & Ekman
 Chaptalia eggersii Urb.
 Chaptalia ekmanii Urb.
 Chaptalia erosa Greene
 Chaptalia estribensis G.L.Nesom
 Chaptalia exscapa (Pers.) Baker
 Chaptalia flavicans Urb. & Ekman
 Chaptalia graminifolia (Dusén ex Dusén) Cabrera
 Chaptalia hermogenis M.D.Moraes
 Chaptalia hidalgoensis L.Cabrera & G.L.Nesom
 Chaptalia hintonii Bullock
 Chaptalia hololeuca Greene
 Chaptalia ignota Burkart
 Chaptalia incana Cuatrec.
 Chaptalia integerrima (Vell.) Burkart
 Chaptalia isernina Cuatrec.
 Chaptalia latipes Urb. & Ekman
 Chaptalia leptophylla Urb.
 Chaptalia lyratifolia Burkart
 Chaptalia madrensis G.L.Nesom
 Chaptalia malcabalensis Cuatrec.
 Chaptalia mandonii (Sch.Bip.) Sch.Bip. ex Burkart
 Chaptalia martii (Baker) Zardini
 Chaptalia media (Griseb.) Urb.
 Chaptalia membranacea Urb.
 Chaptalia meridensis S.F.Blake
 Chaptalia modesta Burkart
 Chaptalia montana Britton
 Chaptalia mornicola Urb. & Ekman
 Chaptalia nipensis Urb.
 Chaptalia nutans (L.) Polák
 Chaptalia oblonga D.Don
 Chaptalia paramensis Cuatrec.
 Chaptalia piloselloides (Vahl) Baker
 Chaptalia pringlei Greene
 Chaptalia pumila (Sw.) Urb.
 Chaptalia rocana Britton & P.Wilson
 Chaptalia rotundifolia D.Don
 Chaptalia runcinata Kunth
 Chaptalia shaferi Britton & P.Wilson
 Chaptalia similis R.E.Fr.
 Chaptalia sinuata (Less.) Vent. ex Steud.
 Chaptalia spathulata (D.Don) Hemsl.
 Chaptalia stenocephala (Griseb.) Urb.
 Chaptalia stuebelii Hieron.
 Chaptalia texana Greene
 Chaptalia tomentosa Vent.
 Chaptalia transiliens G.L.Nesom
 Chaptalia turquinensis Borhidi & O.Muñiz
 Chaptalia undulata Urb. & Ekman
 Chaptalia vegaensis Urb. & Ekman

References

Asteraceae genera
Mutisieae